Simon Rösner (born 5 November 1987 in Würzburg) is a German former professional squash player. He broke the Top 10 in the PSA World Rankings for the first time in November 2014, going on to become the highest-ranked male German player of all time. Rosner subsequently reached a world ranking of No. 6 matching Germany's Sabine Schone's career-high world ranking of No. 6 in June 2015. Rosner broke into the world Top 5 in June 2018 and Top 3 in December 2018 making him the highest-ever-ranked German player.

Career overview
In October 2012, Rosner won the Santiago Squash Open against Cameron Pilley in the final.

In 2013, in what was referred to as the battle of the giants, he beat Omar Mosaad in 5 games in the North American Open to reach the quarter-finals of a World Series tournament for the second time. In the same year, he was silver medalist of the World Games in Cali and won the Alwatan and Asnan International, a PSA International 50 tournament, in Kuwait defeating Borja Golán in the final in 3 games.

In 2017, he won a gold medal at The World Games in  Wroclaw, Poland.

In January 2018, he became the first German player to win a PSA World Series tournament at the Tournament of Champions, played in Grand Central Station, New York, after he followed up a stunning semi-final upset of World No.1 Grégory Gaultier to take an 11-8, 11-9, 6-11, 11-5 victory over World No.7 Tarek Momen in 71 minutes.

Rosner reached two consecutive finals and three consecutive semi-finals in the US-Open, Qatar Classics and Hong Kong Open, respectively making 2018 the best year on the World Tour. He has been the world No. 5 between June 2018 and November 2018 and No. 3 in December 2018.

On 21 December 2020, Rösner announced his retirement from the PSA World Tour. He was ranked No.1 in Germany and No.8 in the world.

References

External links 
 
 
 

1987 births
Living people
German male squash players
World Games medalists in squash
World Games gold medalists
World Games silver medalists
Competitors at the 2013 World Games
Competitors at the 2017 World Games
Competitors at the 2022 World Games
Sportspeople from Würzburg